Elizabeth Webster is an English actress. She has portrayed the part of Walda Bolton in the HBO series Game of Thrones in season 4, season 5 and season 6.

Filmography

Film

Television

References

External links
 

English actresses
Living people
21st-century English actresses
English television actresses
Year of birth missing (living people)
Place of birth missing (living people)
English film actresses